Niwari may refer to:

 Niwari, Madhya Pradesh
 Niwari, Uttar Pradesh
 Niwari district, Madhya Pradesh
 Niwari (Vidhan Sabha constituency), Madhya Pradesh